Alan Courtis (born February 22, 1972) is an Argentine musician, artist, composer and sound artist. He studied classical guitar, piano, theory and composition. He holds a degree in Communication Science from the University of Buenos Aires, where he currently runs an annual music workshop. He played electric guitar in diverse bands and in 1993 he co-founded the group Reynols. With this group he has released more than one hundred CDs and vinyls worldwide in labels like Trente Oiseaux, Digital Narcis, Drone Records, Locust, Sedimental, Beta-Lactam Ring Records, Celebrate Psi Phenomenon, RRR, Audiobot Records, Roaratorio, JDK, Reverse, Matching Head, American Tapes, Last Visible Dog, Carbon Records, Mikroton, etc.

Discography
 ANLA COURTIS & MAMA BAER & KOMMISSAR HJULER / NICOLA HEIN & STEVE DALACHINSKY "Possessed Anticipation" (2019) Split-LP. Psych.KG. Germany
 "Cassetopia" (2014) LP ini.itu. Indonesia/Belgium
 ANLA COURTIS, MAMA BAER & KOMMISSAR HJULER "Die Antizipation des Generalized Other" (2011) SHMF. Germany
 ALAN COURTIS, JAIME GENOVART, CHRISTOF KURZMANN, PABLO RECHE "Palmar Zähler" (2009) Mikroton Recordings CD 2. Russia
 "Unstringed Guitar & Cymbals" (2008) BN034CD. Blossoming Noise. US
 ANLA COURTIS, SEIICHI YAMAMOTO & YOSHIMI "Live at Kanadian" (2008) PE110. Public Eyesore. US
 "SHISHKABALA" (2009) CHOCOLATE CASKET REC. US.
 "Llegaron..." (2008) ltd. square 8".av008. Alt.Vinyl. UK
 "Live in Hamburg" (2008) Wachsender Prozess. Germany
 "Alarma Entrópica" (2008) cd-card. Ambolt28. Ambolthue. Norway
 "Las Sales Fundentes" (2007) 2xCD. Om05. OM Discos. Argentina
 "Algarrobina Sólida" (2007) Horrible Registros. Chile
 COURTIS-WEHOWSKY "Return of the Stone Spirits" (2007) Beta-Lactam Ring Records. US.
 TONY HERRINGTON/ALAN COURTIS (2007) jm#5 (limited canvas edition). Joint Multiples. UK
 MARHAUG/COURTIS "Jordslev Hojaldre" (2007) MC046. Quasipop. Ukraine
 "Live in Christiania" (2007) C-20. Beyond Repair Records. Denmark
 "250107" (2007) Lathe-CDr. P009. Produck. Germany
 "Broken Walkman Research" (2007) MHW. UK
 ÜL "II" (2007) FR001. Facon Records. Argentina
 "Live @ Imvated Motel" (2007) Incidental Recordings. Belgium
 ÜL "Astropecuario" (2007) Pjorn Records. Scotland. UK
 RECHE-COURTIS "Amsterdam 301005" (2007) Sounds from the Pocket. US
 "Psi Gtr Avalanche" (2007) yellow 7". Smittekilde. Denmark.
 BIRCHVILLE CAT MOTEL & ANLA COURTIS "Thee Sparkling Echoes" (2007) Celebrate Psi Phenomenon. New Zealand
 "Tape Works" (2006) P21040-2. Pogus Productions. US
 "H-Puna" (2006) GSA-18. GeneratorSoundArt. US
 COURTIS/KLINGSOR/VED "Live på På Besök"(2006) müss07. Mussigganger. Sweden
 DYLAN NYOUKIS & ANLA COURTIS "Fight the Pyramids" (2006) Choc-155. Chocolate Monk. UK
 "Live Actions" (2006) HL005. Herbal Records. Malaysia
 COURTIS-MOGLASS-KIRITCHENKO (2006). NS49.Nexsound/Carbon/1000+1Tilt/ Goldsoundz/Tibprod. Ukrania/US/Greece/Norway
 TORE H. BOE/ANLA COURTIS "Blot og Mono Middagshvil" (2006) Thisk037. Thisco. Portugal
 STROUNTES! Maria Eriksson, Mats Gustafsson & Anla Courtis (2006) Slottet. Sweden
 MUTANTEA "Sleepy Sounds Electric" (2006) Ikuisuus. Finland
 Culver/Courtis split tour tape (2006) MH130. Matching Head. UK
 "Noiselovlive" (2006) es51. Xerxes. Japan
 KAWABATA MAKOTO, ANLA COURTIS & ROKUGENKIN "Kokura" (2006) REPOSELP010. Riot Season. UK
 "Antiguos Dólmenes del Paleolítico" (2006) SEDCD042. Sedimental. US
 "(the name of this drone is hidden in your DNA)" (2006) Ikuisuus. Finland
 Courtis-Erkizia/Monopolka "Live in Peru" (2006) Monopolka. Russia
 Anla Courtis & Thomas Dimuzio "Live at the Luggage Store" (2006) Gench. US
 "Seattle Flow" (2006) kd24. Kningdisk. Sweden
 BILLY BAO "R'N'R Granulator" (2005) CD. W.M.O./R. Spain/UK
 "Live in Fukuoka" (2005) HODE113/K. Scrotum Records. Germany
 COURTIS_ MATSUNAGA collab CD (2005) Prele/Kokeko. France/Japan
 "Live in L.A." (2005) The Seedy R (Pseudo-Arcana). New Zealand
 RECHE-COURTIS "Transistores de Aire" (2005). Conv019. Con-V. Spain
 "Endless Cassette Research Vol.1" (2005) UCD21. Ultra. Russia
 COURTIS-ROMERO "Psychomemory of..." (2005) P36. P-Tapes. US
 COURTIS/THE SOVIET SEX MACHINES (2005) M60. Monopolka. Russia
 "Tribute to Calcium" (2005) tons019. Tonschacht. Germany.
 "(the name of this drone is hidden in your DNA)" (2004) Nidnod. UK.
 "Suite for Processed Marimbas" (2004) Audiobot. Belgium.
 "...y el resplandor de la luz no conoce limites." (2004) LTJ-25. 267 Lattajjaa. Finland
 CULVER-COURTIS (2004) Riot Season. UK.
 "Los Alamos" (2004) Celebrate Psi Phenomenon. New Zealand.
 "Recycled Music Tape" (2004) RRR. US
 COURTIS-MARHAUG "North & South Neutrino" (2004) afro2021. AntiFrost. Greece
 "Presencia de lo No-Manifestado en lo Manifestado" (2004) AST#0015. Astipalea. Poland
 "Harmonica F'ever" (2003) PS#8. Pink Skulls/Jewelled Antler. US
 "Fractal Albur Solenoide" (2003) 23CD0121. 23 Productions. US
 "Albumina Blues" (2001) Freedom From. US
 COURTISZAN (2000)(w/ Zan Hoffman) "Meretrix". C60. Zidsic. US
 "Greatest Hits" (1999) Lonely Whistle Music. US
 COURTIS/LATE (1999) "Failures in Modern Recording" C-30. White Tapes. US
 "Eating an Estufa" (1998) Freedom From. US
 CULVER-COURTIS (1997) Matching Head/F.D.R Tapes/Capeet. UK, US & Austria.
 "The Distorted Micromoog Atofia Vol.1" (1997) Komkol Autoprod. Norway.
 "Poliestireno Expandido" (1996) MH53. Matching Head. UK

Performances

 No Music Festival. US. 2001
 DreamFestival. US. 2001
 Ny Musik. Norway. 2003
 Stockholm New Music Festival. Sweden. 2003
 Sonic Protest. Paris. France. 2003
 Podewil (Berlin*Buenos Aires). Germany 2004
 Live in de Living. Belgium. 2004
 Bag of Spoon. Paris. France. 2004
 Decibel Festival Buenos Aires. Argentina 2004
 Line Space Line. Los Angeles. US. 2005
 Common Sounds/Sonidos Comunes. Lima. Peru. 2005
 LEM Festival. Barcelona. Spain. 2005
 Ressort Off: Latin America. Netherlands. 2005
 Korona Experimental Intermedia. Koln. Germany. 2006
 No Spaghetti Edition Festival. Norway/Arg. 2005
 Decibel Festival Buenos Aires. Argentina. 2005
 Frankfurter Forum fur Elektronische und Neue Musik. Germany. 2005
 Interzones. Rennes. France. 2005
 Feria de la Artes. Bariloche. Argentina. 2006
 Niu Fest. Cordoba. Argentina. 2006
 Fin de la Ruta 5. La Pampa. Argentina. 2006
 Dans for Voksne. Oslo. Norway. 2006
 Potlach. Helsinki. Finland. 2006
 Koloni. Goteborg. Sweden. 2006
 Borealis Festival. Norway. 2006
 Epsilonia Radio Festival. France. 2006
 Territorio Electrico. Spain. 2006
 The Termite. Leeds. England. 2006
 Vamos Festival. Newcastle. England. 2006
 Qujocho. Linz. Austria. 2007
 Koloni. Goteborg. Sweden. 2007
 New Perspectives Festival. Vaasteras. Sweden 2007

References

External links 
 Anla Courtis Official site (Archived 2009-10-25)
 Anla Courtis at Discogs

1972 births
Experimental musicians
Argentine electronic musicians
Sound artists
Living people
Fruits de Mer Records artists